Claude L. Gilbert (born July 10, 1932) is a former American college football coach. He served as head football coach at San Diego State University from 1973 to 1980, and San Jose State University from 1984 to 1989, compiling a career record of 99–56–3.

Early life and education
Born in Oklahoma, Gilbert graduated from Bakersfield High School in Bakersfield, California in 1950. He went to Bakersfield College for a year and played on the football team before serving in the United States Air Force for the Korean War. He returned to Bakersfield College, then transferred to San Jose State University in 1956 and lettered in football for two years with the San Jose State Spartans.

Coaching career
Gilbert was an assistant football, wrestling, and track coach at Tulare High School in Tulare, California from 1959 to 1960.

After serving as assistant to San Diego State coach Don Coryell for six seasons, Gilbert succeeded him as head coach in 1973. He compiled a 61–26–2 record and won three conference titles, ranking second in Aztec victories and winning percentage only to Coryell. They finished 10–1 in both 1976 and 1977. 1977 also saw the Aztecs crush Bobby Bowden's Florida State team 41–16, and finish ranked 16th in the nation. During a transition from relying on junior college transfers to recruiting high school students, the Aztecs went 4–8 in 1980 and fired Gilbert in a controversial move.

Gilbert later became head coach at his alma mater, San Jose State, from 1984 to 1989. He compiled a 38–30–1 record, including a pair of consecutive 10–2 seasons in 1986 and 1987. Gilbert was fired from San Jose State following the 1989 season after signing 21 junior college transfers, against orders from administration to limit scholarships offered to such student-athletes. Gilbert sued San Jose State for wrongful termination in 1990, but a state appeals court dismissed the lawsuit in 1992.

Gilbert returned to San Diego State as defensive coordinator under Ted Tollner in 1995, and oversaw consecutive eight-win seasons, which was not achieved until 2010 and 2011.

Gilbert was inducted into the Aztec Hall of Fame in 2004, and into the Spartan Stadium Ring of Honor in 2006.

Head coaching record

College

References

External links
 San Diego State bio (archived from 1999)

1932 births
Living people
Bakersfield Renegades football players
Frankfurt Galaxy coaches
San Diego State Aztecs football coaches
San Jose State Spartans football coaches
San Jose State Spartans football players
Bakersfield Renegades football coaches
High school football coaches in California
High school football coaches in New Mexico
Junior college football coaches in the United States
United States Air Force officers
United States Air Force personnel of the Korean War
Coaches of American football from California
Players of American football from Bakersfield, California
Military personnel from California